"Homeland" is a song recorded by American country music artist Kenny Rogers.  It was released in November 2001 as the third single from the album There You Go Again.  The song reached #39 on the Billboard Hot Country Singles & Tracks chart.  The song was written by Jack Sundrud and Keith Miles.

Chart performance

References

2001 singles
2000 songs
Kenny Rogers songs
Song recordings produced by Brent Maher